Mitsuma Matsumura (January 8, 1894 – April 10, 1970) was a Japanese politician who served as governor of Hiroshima Prefecture from Aug. 1, 1944 to Apr. 21, 1945. He was also governor of Tochigi Prefecture (1936–1937) and Kanagawa Prefecture (1940–1942).

References

Governors of Hiroshima
1894 births
1970 deaths
Governors of Tochigi Prefecture
Governors of Kanagawa Prefecture